The Armenian National Committee of Australia (ANC-AU) is considered one of the largest and most influential grassroots organization representing the Armenian Australian community in Australia. ANC-AU represents a total of 36 Armenian-Australian organisations with over 5,500 memberships, in addition to the broader Armenian-Australian community of an estimated 50,000.

ANC-AU works in areas of political and educational activities, including:

 Informing and influencing the Australian Government policy on affairs of interest to the Armenian-Australian community;
 Raising public awareness in support of an independent and united Armenia;
 Representing the collective Armenian-Australian community on public policy.

In February 2020, the signing of a Memorandum of Understanding by the Armenian National Committee of Australia (ANC-AU), Assyrian Universal Alliance (AUA) and Australian Hellenic Council (AHC) initiated the launch of the Joint Justice Initiative at Australia's Parliament House, calling for Australia's national recognition of the Armenian, Assyrian and Greek Genocides of 1915 as a priority on behalf of their communities.

Michael Kolokossian was appointed the organisation's Executive Director in June 2022.

Executive Directors

References

External links 
 Official website

Armenian Revolutionary Federation
Armenia–Australia relations
Political advocacy groups in Australia